Leonid Lvovich Kerber ( Körber) (17 June 1903— 9 October 1993) was a Soviet radioengineer, expert in aviation equipment, long-time co-worker of Andrei Tupolev and his deputy during 1953-1968.

Awards
 Order of the Patriotic War, 1st class (1944)
 Order of Lenin (2)
 Order of the Red Star
 Lenin Prize
 USSR State Prize
 Various medals

References

1903 births
1993 deaths
Sharashka inmates
Soviet aerospace engineers
Recipients of the Order of Lenin
Recipients of the USSR State Prize
Lenin Prize winners